Prorophora curvibasella is a species of snout moth. It is found in Uzbekistan.

References

Phycitinae
Moths described in 1887